Bjæverskov is a town in Køge Municipality, with a population of 2,988 (1 January 2022) at the road between Køge and Ringsted about 10 kilometres west of Køge and 16 kilometres/10 miles east of Ringsted.

History
In the Middle Ages an estate was located just west of Bjæverskov church. In 1999 Køge Museum made an archeological excavation on the site when Bjæverskovskatten (The Bjæverskov Treasure), a three-legged ore pot containing approx. 2550 coins and some jewelry from about 1254-59, was found.

Notable people 
 Anders Petersen (1827 in Bjæverskov – 1914) a school teacher and author of historical, genealogical and statistical books
 David Borchersen (born 1978 at Bjæverskov) a cricketer, a right-handed batsman who bowls right-arm medium pace
 Anita Madsen (born 1995) a Danish former competitive figure skater, lives in Bjæverskov

References

Cities and towns in Region Zealand
Køge Municipality